June Karen Daugherty (née Brewer; August 11, 1956 – August 2, 2021) was an American women's college basketball coach who was head coach at Washington State University.

Coaching career
In her seven years as head coach at Boise State from 1989 to 1996, Daugherty finished with a 122-75 record, 73-31 in the Big Sky Conference.

In her 11 years at Washington from 1996 to 2007, Daugherty took her teams to the NCAA tournament 6 times, including her final year. Her contract was not renewed after the season. Daugherty finished with a 191-131 record, 113-85 in the Pac-10.

Daugherty became head coach at rival Washington State in 2007 after being fired from Washington. She led Washington State to WNIT appearances in 2014 and 2015. On March 13, 2018, it was announced that Daugherty was terminated as head coach of WSU.

Personal life
Daugherty was married to husband Mike, who formerly served as the associate head coach for WSU], and University of Washington|UW. They have twin children, Doc and Breanne.

She suffered from health issues for many years, and died at the age of 64 from heart troubles.

Head coaching record

References

1956 births
2021 deaths
Boise State Broncos women's basketball coaches
Kent State Golden Flashes women's basketball coaches
Ohio State Buckeyes women's basketball players
Stanford Cardinal women's basketball coaches
Washington Huskies women's basketball coaches
Washington State Cougars women's basketball coaches
American women's basketball coaches
Sportspeople from Columbus, Ohio
Sports deaths in Idaho
Basketball players from Columbus, Ohio